The Government Bilingual High School (GBHS) is a secondary school in Limbe, Cameroon.

See also

 Education in Cameroon
 National Comprehensive High School
 Government High School (GHS) Limbe

References

Educational institutions with year of establishment missing
Secondary schools in Cameroon
Southwest Region (Cameroon)